Neighbours is an Australian television soap opera created by Reg Watson. It was first broadcast on 18 March 1985. The following is a list of characters that first appeared in the serial in 1990, by order of first appearance. All characters were introduced by the show's executive producer Don Battye. The sixth season of Neighbours began airing from 11 January 1990. January saw the arrival of the Alessi twins Caroline and Christina Alessi played by Gayle & Gillian Blakeney. In February, Josh Anderson and Ryan McLachlan, played by Jeremy Angerson and Richard Norton, respectively, made their first appearances. That same month British actor Derek Nimmo guested as Lord Ledgerwood. Maggie Dence arrived as new principal Dorothy Burke in March. Bob La Castra joined the serial as Eddie Buckingham in April, and Stephen Hall also joined the cast that month as Boof. Beth Buchanan began playing Gemma Ramsay, the niece of established character Madge Bishop in June. The following months, three more members of the new Willis family arrived, Doug, Pam and Adam, played by Terence Donovan, Sue Jones and Ian Williams, respectively. Alison Whyte guested as environmentalist Amber Martin in September and Richard Huggett arrived as Glen Donnelly.

Caroline Alessi

Caroline Alessi, played by Gillian Blakeney, made her first on-screen appearance on 18 January 1990. Writers devised relationship stories for Caroline alongside the characters Adam Willis (Ian Williams) and Jim Robinson (Alan Dale). A notable storyline for the character was kissing her sister Christina's (Gayle Blakeney) husband Paul Robinson (Stefan Dennis).

Christina Alessi

Christina Alessi, played by Gayle Blakeney, made her first on-screen appearance on 18 January 1990. Christina is the twin sister of Caroline Alessi (Gillian Blakeney). Christina later marries long-standing character  A notable storyline for the character occurred when she ran off with her son Andrew Robinson (Shannon Holmes) without informing Paul.

Josh Anderson

Joshua "Josh" Anderson, played by Jeremy Angerson, made his first on-screen during the episode broadcast on 5 February 1990. He arrives in Erinsborough because his father relocates to the area to run a news agents. Producers hired Angerson because they were increasing the size of the male cast following the departure of popular characters. Josh is characterised as friendly, academically bright and good at chemistry. The character helped to form the show's teenage character group of his era alongside Todd Landers (Kristian Schmid), Melissa Jarrett (Jade Amenta) and Cody Willis (Amelia Frid).

Ryan McLachlan

Ryan McLachlan, played by Richard Norton, made his first screen appearance on 15 February 1990. Norton told Chrissie Camp of TV Week that he "couldn't believe his luck" when he received the role of Ryan. He moved to Melbourne aged 19 to begin filming. Ryan is the older brother of Tiffany McLachlan (Amber Kilpatrick) and very protective towards his younger sister. Ryan and Tiffany come to Ramsay Street to stay with their aunt, Dorothy Burke (Maggie Dence). Norton stayed with Neighbours for one year and left to join the cast of rival soap opera Home and Away. Writers devised an exit storyline which saw him leave Erinsborough to join the army.

Lord Ledgerwood

Lord Ledgerwood, played by Derek Nimmo, made his first screen appearance during the episode broadcast on 26 February 1990. The character and Nimmo's casting were announced on 6 December 1989. James Cockington from The Sydney Morning Herald reported that the British actor had joined the cast in a guest role. He filmed on location in Lyme Park, Cheshire in the United Kingdom alongside Anne Charleston and Ian Smith who play Madge Bishop and Harold Bishop respectively. Cockington said the scenes were due to air in February which were billed as two special episodes. Nimmo was interested in appearing in Neighbours when he was approached because he thought it would be a free holiday. But they informed him that filming would take place in his own country. Nimmo told Cockington that he believed the episodes would be well received by Australian viewers because of his character. He branded Lord Ledgerwood a "archetypal silly Pom" which in his opinion Australians like. The character has been described as an "eccentric peer". Rosemary Daniels (Joy Chambers) also featured in his storyline.

Madge and Harold walk around Lyme Park in England where they see Rosemary. She thinks she will need to fly back to the US and asks Madge and Harold to find Lord Ledgerwood and secure her business deal. They visit his estate but he refuses to see them. Rosemary arrives having not left after all. Lord Ledgerwood agrees to see Rosemary and he shows everyone around. The character's final appearance was screened on 27 February 1990.

Dorothy Burke

Dorothy Burke (previously McLachlan), played by Maggie Dence, made her first on-screen appearance on 7 March 1990. The actress was appearing in a theatre production when she was approached by a representative from Grundy to join the show. Dorothy's storylines were written to include a mixture of comedy and drama. Dorothy lived on Ramsay Street alongside her niece Tiffany (Amber Kilpatrick) and nephew Ryan McLachlan (Richard Norton). In 1993, Dorothy meets Tom Merrick (Robert Essex), a school inspector who comes to evaluate Erinsborough High and they fall in love. This leads to her departure alongside Tom.

Eddie Buckingham

Edward "Eddie" Buckingham, played by Bob La Castra, made his first screen appearance during the episode broadcast on 2 April 1990. La Castra created the character for himself after he was told that casting him the soap would be difficult because of his ethnic background. He auditioned for Neighbours via video tape. La Castra was written out of Neighbours in October 1990 along with a series of characters, so the producers could make a return to focusing on family-oriented drama. Eddie departed on 28 September 1990.

Boof

Gary "Boof" Head, played by Stephen Hall, made his first screen appearance during the episode broadcast on 19 April 1990. Caron Eastgate from TV Week reported that Boof would be responsible for the breakdown of Todd Landers (Kristian Schmid) and Melissa Jarrett's (Jade Amenta) relationship. Melissa's mother would ban her from seeing Tood after Boof convinces him to break-in a local car crushing office. The two characters burgle the office and take spare parts to repair their bikes with. Hall had guested on the serial the previous year as Angus Owens.

Boof is introduced during a bike race alongside established characters Todd, Melissa, Ryan McLachlan (Richard Norton), Josh Anderson (Jeremy Angerson) and Cody Willis (Amelia Frid). He purposely knocks Cody off her bike and she injures her knee. He then teases Ryan about Cody. The race upsets local pensioner Lester Cooper (Roy Baldwin) who tells them off and orders them away from his land. Boof begins to threaten Lester and pushes him over. Ryan stands up to Boof for bullying a pensioner. Kerry Bishop (Linda Hartley-Clark) becomes annoyed at Boof for vandalising the park and shouts at him.

Boof gets his friends to hang around Ryan's work. They begin to smash plates and threaten to beat Ryan up. Boof begins spending time with Todd and gets him to break in the local car crushing office. They are caught, arrested and given a court date. Boof is later sent to juvenile detention and Todd is free to leave after being given a given a good behaviour bond. Boof later threatens Todd with a piece of wood but Josh comes to help him. When Boof does not back down, Josh beats him up. Boof later hassles Melissa and Cody but runs off when Josh appears.

Two years later, Boof returns to Erinsborough and begins bullying Toby Mangel (Ben Guerens) into stealing for him by threatening to hurt his dog Bouncer and kidnaps him as leverage, holding him hostage in a metal shed at a scrapyard. He also begins hassling Rick Alessi (Dan Falzon), who is initially blamed for a spate of thefts in the street and bullies him into stealing too, but Rick and his brother, Marco (Felice Arena) come up with a plan to foil Boof. After Marco secretly rescues Bouncer from the scrapyard, Rick and Toby bring Cameron Hudson's (Benjamin Grant Mitchell) motorbike to Boof. When Boof goes to the shed to retrieve Bouncer, Marco pushes him inside with another dog, Fang. Marco agrees to let Boof out if he agrees to sign a confession. Boof initially refuses but when relents when Marco is prepared to let Fang off the leash and signs. Boof is then arrested and sent back to prison.

Several months later, Boof reappears as a member of "The Peace Patrol", a Neighbourhood watch group. He appears to foil a robbery but it is later discovered that he and another group member, Clay (Russell Frost), staged the whole thing in order to get publicity in the paper from Cameron, who is a journalist.

Gemma Ramsay

Gemma Ramsay, played by Beth Buchanan, made her first on-screen appearance on 20 June 1990. In March 1990, a Neighbours publicist confirmed that producers were negotiating with Buchanan to join the show. She was signed to a six-month contract and told it could be extended. Gemma arrives in Erinsborough to live with Madge Bishop (Anne Charleston) following the death of her mother. Gemma is characterised as "care free and independent" but is more interested in having a good time rather than studying. But she is intelligent and cable of achieving more than she does.

Doug Willis

Douglas "Doug" Willis, played by Terence Donovan, made his first screen appearance during the episode broadcast on 18 July 1990. Following a short stint in rival Australian soap opera Home and Away, Donovan joined the cast of Neighbours in 1990. He was cast in the role of Doug, the patriarch of the newly introduced Willis family and husband to Pam (Sue Jones). The family aspect was one of the main reasons Donovan accepted the part. The character has been used to portray the effects of depression and Alzheimer's disease.

Pam Willis

Pamela "Pam" Willis (previously Beresford), played by Sue Jones, made her first screen appearance during the episode broadcast on 6 August 1990. Jones carried out a screen-test for the show and was offered the part. Trained as a nurse, Pam arrives as a full-time mother to her four children: Adam (Ian Williams), Gaby (Rachel Blakely), Brad (Scott Michaelson) and Cody (Amelia Frid). She is married to Doug Willis (Terence Donovan). A notable storyline for the character saw Pam accused of murdering her patient, Garth Kirby (Roy Baldwin).

Adam Willis

Adam Willis, played by Ian Williams, made his first appearance on 9 August 1990. Williams was signed up to appear in the show in early 1990 but did not know exact details about his character. In April that year writers were still working on stories for the character. Williams was filming a role in Bony, another Grundy production. He was scheduled to begin filming in June once that Bony had finished production. Williams said the part appealed to him as it was flexible and Adam's humour kept him "fired up." Williams explained that he felt similar to his character as they both loved their families, but he was not impressed with Adam's naivety. Writers devised romance storylines for the character involving Caroline Alessi (Gillian Blakeney) and Gemma Ramsay (Beth Buchanan).

Amber Martin

Amber Martin, played by Alison Whyte, made her first on-screen appearance in the episode broadcast 27 August 1990. Amber is an environmental activist who arrives in Erinsborough to visit her lifelong best friend of Kerry Bishop (Linda Hartley-Clark). Amber was introduced as part of Hartley-Clark's departure from the series. Amber's arrival makes Kerry realise how much her life has changed since she married Joe Mangel (Mark Little). Hartley-Clark told Chrissie Camp from TV Week that "when Amber comes back into Kerry's life, Kerry realises how domestic she has become and she's determined to be more active in marches and protests." She added that Joe is against her involvement but Amber makes her realise that she needs more than to stay at home raising her family. Amber learns that there is a duck hunting session being held in marshlands and asks Kerry to join her and form a protest against the hunters. Joe pleads with Kerry to reconsider but Hartley-Clark explained that her character is "adamant" she must join Amber on the protest. The scenes were filmed outside of Melbourne and the actors were forced to contend with slime, frogs and spiders during the location shoot. The protest ends in tragedy for Kerry as a hunter shoots and kills her.

Amber arrives to see Kerry and they remember old times when Kerry was more involved in activism for wildlife. Amber later makes her realise that she has become uninvolved with protesting, forcing her to evaluate her stance. Amber decides to show Joe's son Toby (Ben Geurens) pictures of dead animals to try and show him the reality of the meat industry. Kerry and Joe are shocked and forbid her to involve Toby in activism. Amber learns that duck hunting season is beginning on marshlands and invites Kerry to protest at the area. When they arrive they find injured birds which upsets Kerry and she confronts a group of hunters. Kerry is shot and killed and Joe blames Amber for Kerry's death and throws her out of the house and bars her from Kerry's funeral. However, Amber arrives and Joe tries to stop her from giving her eulogy but Matt Robinson (Ashley Paske) prevents him from doing so. Amber tells everyone that Kerry was lucky to find love with Joe even if only for a short while. Amber leaves Erinsborough after the funeral.

Glen Donnelly

Glen Donnelly, played by Richard Huggett, made his first on-screen appearance on 7 December 1990. Huggett joined Neighbours after completing a regular role on rival soap opera E Street. Glen is characterised as "independent, tough and mature beyond his twenty years". Glen's most notable storyline was his incestuous relationship with his half-sister Lucy (Melissa Bell). This was Neighbours first incest storyline.

Others

References

External links
 Characters and cast at the Official AU Neighbours website
 Characters and cast at the Internet Movie Database

1990
, Neighbours